Call signs in Asia are rarely used to identify broadcast stations. In most Asian countries, broadcast stations use other forms of identification. Japan, South Korea, Indonesia, the Philippines and Taiwan are exceptions to this rule. Amateur radio stations in India, Pakistan, Korea and Japan are allocated call-signs.

Amateur radio

The Wireless and Planning and Coordination Wing (WPC), a division of the Ministry of Communications and Information Technology, regulates amateur radio in India. Amateur radio call-signs of Pakistan are issued by the Pakistan Telecommunication Authority (PTA). The PARS operates a QSL bureau for those amateur radio operators in regular contact with amateur radio operators in other countries, and supports amateur radio operating awards and radio contests. The Pakistan Amateur Radio Society represents the interest of Pakistan amateur radio operators before national and international regulatory authorities. PARS is the national member society representing Pakistan in the International Amateur Radio Union.

In Japan, it is regulated by the Ministry of Internal Affairs and Communications with the Japan Amateur Radio League acting as a national amateur radio organization.

In South Korea call signs are regulated by the Korea Communications Commission in the Ministry of Information and Communication.

China

The International Telecommunication Union has assigned China the call sign prefixes B, VR, XS, XX and 3H-3U. Only prefixes B, VR and XX are currently under active use, with all other prefixes under reserves. Domestic commercial broadcasting stations in no part of China uses alphanumeric call signs. The following call sign allocation applies only to amateur radio.

Mainland China 

Mainland China uses call sign prefixes BA-BL, BR-BT, BY and BZ for routine operation, and singular B for temporary event stations. The second character for a routine operation call sign indicates the type of the station. Call signs in Mainland China are now lifetime assignments, for as long as the station license is valid. It also no longer distinguish individual-owned and institution-owned stations, and no longer reflect the operator's license class. Existing call signs at the time of the rule change are grandfathered.

The separating numeral indicate the call area. It along with the first letter afterwards indicates the geographic location the station is registered in.

Hong Kong and Macau 

Hong Kong uses VR as its amateur radio call sign prefix. Currently the only the separating numeral 2 is in use, thus all Hong Kong amateur radio stations begin with VR2. In the period of 1 July 2022 to 30 June 2023, in celebration of the 25 years of the establishment of the SAR, OFCA temporarily allows operators to use VR25 as the prefix, in addition to the usual VR2.

Macau uses XX as its amateur radio call sign prefix. Currently the only the separating numeral 9 is in use, thus all Macau amateur radio stations begin with XX9.

Indonesia

Call signs prefixes used in Indonesia:
 JZ for CB radio
 PM for radio stations except public broadcaster RRI. PM prefix is always followed by number determined by province, letter "B" usually for AM and "F" usually for FM ("C" in parts of Sumatra, "D" in parts of Kalimantan), and two unique characters. These call signs are always in 6 characters. For example, PM2FGD refers to 96.7 Hitz FM,a defunct station in Jakarta province. Almost all radio stations in Jakarta shows call sign in TuneIn streaming website. For example, all-news radio Elshinta 90.0 has call sign PM2FGZ.
Private-owned radio station call signs by region are different with amateur radio call letters. The division is based on province area before 1998, so no call prefix are assigned for newer provinces. For example, Banten has the same call number and initial letter with West Java.

 YB-YH for Amateur radio
 YB & YE for Extra Class
 YC & YF for Advanced Class
 YD & YG for General Class

Call signs suffixes used in Indonesia:
 AA - YZ 
 AAA - PZZ
 RAA - YZZ 
 AAAA - YZZZ
 AQA - AQZ (special license/foreigner operator)

Special License Callsigns suffixes :
 A - Z 
 ZA - ZZ Province Organization included Scout; Redcross; SAR 
 ZAA - ZZZ Regency (Local) Organization included Club Station; Scout; Redcross; SAR
 ZAAA - ZZZZ

Japan

The Japanese station prefix for radio and television stations is JO followed by its own unique two letters; the last letter in the latter part of the callsign identifies the ownership of the station, for example the letter X indicates that it is a commercial TV station such as JOEX-TV for TV Asahi and JOCX-TV for Fuji TV while the letter R indicates that it is a commercial AM radio station such as JOKR for TBS Radio.

FM radio and TV stations have the -FM (FM radio), -TV (analog television), -DTV (digital television), -TAM (audio multiplex), -TCM (analog TV teletext multiplex), -TDM (analog TV data multiplex) and -FCM (FM radio data multiplex) suffixes after their callsigns, similar to the North American practice, except for AM radio stations.

At the greatest extent of the empire during the Second World War, another second letter was used for the empires other possessions besides the Home Islands.
 "B" for Korea
 "F" for Taiwan
 "Q" for Manchukuo and Kwantung (Kantō)

Pakistan

The International Telecommunication Union has assigned Pakistan the cal signs APA through to ASZ. It has divided all countries into three regions; Pakistan is located in ITU Region 3. These regions are further divided into two competing zones, the ITU and the CQ.

The Pakistan Amateur Radio Society (PARS), a national non-profit organization for amateur radio enthusiasts, does not assigns call signs but call signs are assigned by Pakistan Telecommunication Authority (PTA). The PARS operates a QSL bureau for amateur radio operators in contact with amateur radio operators in other countries, and supports amateur radio operating awards and radio contests. The Pakistan Amateur Radio Society represents the interest of Pakistan amateur radio operators before national and international regulatory authorities. PARS is the national member society representing Pakistan in the International Amateur Radio Union.

Philippines

The National Telecommunications Commission assigns the following call sign prefixes from the international series to Philippine broadcasting stations depending on the location of their license:
 DZ & DW for Luzon, except DZ and DY for Palawan
 DY for the Visayas, including Palawan and Masbate
 DX for Mindanao

DW is now also used for stations in Luzon. Out of circumstance, DZ is mostly AM band, while DW is FM band. Other call sign prefixes assigned to the Philippines are DU, and DV.

Amateur Radio

DX1PAR
DX- prefix, 1 - amateur district/region, PAR - suffix

The standard format for Philippine callsigns is 2×3 – where 2 stands for the prefix letters (4D-4I or DU-DZ), and 3 stands for the suffix letters, both of which are assigned and regulated by the National Telecommunications Commission. A suffix can have as much as three characters, and as little as one.

Prefixes:

The NTC assigns prefixes depending on the privileges of the amateur license or for special events:

Class A (Extra Class) – DU, 4F, 4E Class B (General Class) – DV, 4I Class C (Technician Class) – DW, 4G  Class D (Foundation Class) – DY, 4H Club Stations - DX, DZ

Districts:

A district number is assigned to a station depending on its location. The Philippines is divided into nine separate amateur districts.

-National Capital Region, Region IV
-Region I, Region II
-Region III
-Region V
-Region VII
-Region VI
-Region VII
-Region IX, Region XII
-Region X, Region XI

A special event station may also be issued a district number different from those listed above (e.x. 100).

Taiwan 

Taiwan uses prefixes BM-BQ and BU-BX. It too uses the separating numeral to represent the geographic location of the station.

The licensing class and type of the station is represented using the call sign's structure and prefix:

Event stations do not have to adhere to the structure and location rules.

References

External links

Asia
Communications in Asia